Dunny is Australian/New Zealand slang for a toilet.

Dunny may also mean:

 Dunny Goode (1929–2004), head football coach for Eastern New Mexico University
 "Dunny", nickname for Fred Dunlap (1859–1902), 19th century baseball player and manager
 "Dunnies", nickname for the Whitby Dunlops, a Canadian Major League Hockey team
 "Dunny", a toy produced by the company Kidrobot, similar to the Munny

See also
 Dunnie, a character in Anglo-Scottish folklore
 D'ni from the Myst franchise
 Duny, childhood name of the character Ged (Earthsea)